William Pierce Owen (20 November 1860 – 13 December 1937) was a Welsh professional footballer who played as a midfielder (winger, sometimes wing half) for Ruthin Town. He made a total of twelve appearances for Wales.

Personal life
William was the second son of Rev. Elias Owen and older brother of the younger Elias Owen, who also played for Wales. After his playing career, William became a solicitor in Aberystwyth.

Club career
Owen played with Ruthin Town, one of the leading teams in North Wales at that time. He was part of the Ruthin team that lost the final of the 1880 Welsh Cup against Druids.

International appearances
Owen made his senior debut on 15 March 1880 and was part of the first Welsh team that achieved an international victory (0–1 against England in 1881). He scored six times in twelve appearances for Wales in official international matches, as follows:

Honours
Ruthin Town
Welsh Cup finalist: 1880

Notes

References

1860 births
1937 deaths
Welsh footballers
Wales international footballers
Association football midfielders
Ruthin Town F.C. players